The McTavish reservoir, named for Simon McTavish, is an underground reservoir and park located within McGill University's campus on the southern slope of Mount Royal in Montreal, Quebec, Canada. It holds 37 million gallons of water and is supplied by its large Château Style pump-houses located in the south-eastern corner of the park. Atop the reservoir is Rutherford Park. It also is the location of the McTavish automated weather reporting station (CWTA, 71612).

History

The city of Montreal decided to construct the reservoir in 1852, after a devastating fire that destroyed almost half the houses in the city. The fire had broken out while the previous reservoir, located at what is now Saint-Louis Square, was closed for repairs.

The reservoir was constructed between 1852 and 1856 and uses the natural rock of the site to hold water, with some masonry on the south of the reservoir. The McTavish reservoir was increased in size twice after its initial construction. It was subsequently covered in 1957 and the terrain on top used for recreation. The cliff created in the construction of the reservoir is used as an ice climbing location in downtown Montreal.

Nine million dollars was spent in 2008–2009 on upgrading the pump house and reservoir for infrastructure security and preventing water contamination, but the security features have proven to be ineffective and easily infiltrated. The city of Montreal has subsequently attempted to close the park in 2009 and restrict access to the public, citing escalating terrorist threats from the September 11 attacks as the rationale for the non-publicly consulted decision. The park remains accessible as of March 2021.

In 2011, a pipe in the reservoir burst, sending a torrent of water down to the adjacent McGill University. It was not the first time that the reservoir has caused damage to McGill: during its construction in 1852, blasting propelled large rocks through the roof of the McGill College Building, now its Arts Building, causing staff and students to seek refuge.

In January 2013, a severe flooding on the downtown campus of McGill University affecting several buildings and streets in the downtown area was caused by water coming from the McTavish reservoir.

See also
Doctor Penfield Avenue
McTavish Street

References

External links

Old image of the reservoir prior to the demolition of the original pump-house and the covering of the open reservoir.

Buildings and structures in Montreal
Châteauesque architecture in Canada
History of Montreal
McGill University
Mount Royal
Reservoirs in Quebec